Glyphipterix heptaglyphella is a moth of the family Glyphipterigidae. It is found in Belgium, France, Italy and on Sardinia.

References

Moths described in 1925
Glyphipterigidae
Moths of Europe